Hanna Fogelström (born 8 November 1990) is a Swedish handball player. She plays on the Swedish national team and participated at the 2011 World Women's Handball Championship in Brazil.  She was also part of the Swedish squad at the 2012 Summer Olympics.

References

1990 births
Living people
Swedish female handball players
Handball players at the 2012 Summer Olympics
People from Partille Municipality
Olympic handball players of Sweden
Swedish expatriate sportspeople in France
Sportspeople from Västra Götaland County
21st-century Swedish women